Philosophy of the Social Sciences is a peer-reviewed academic journal that covers philosophy of social science. Its editor-in-chief is Ian C. Jarvie (York University). The journal was established in 1971 and is currently published by SAGE Publications.

Abstracting and indexing 
Philosophy of the Social Sciences is abstracted and indexed in Scopus and the Social Sciences Citation Index. According to the Journal Citation Reports, the journal has a 2017 impact factor of 0.559, ranking it 40th out of 51 journals in the category "Ethics".

See also 
 List of ethics journals

References

External links 
 

SAGE Publishing academic journals
English-language journals
Philosophy of science journals
Multidisciplinary social science journals
Quarterly journals
Publications established in 1971